Iphigénie Decaux or Vicomtesse Iphigenie Decaux, née Milet-Moreau (17 June 1778 – 8 July 1862) was a French flower painter.

Decaux was born in Toulon as the daughter of Louis Marie de Milet de Mureau. She took lessons from the flower painter Jan Frans van Dael and became an accomplished painter in her own right, though because of her wealthy connections she painted more as a hobby than for a living. In 1800 she married Louis Victor de Blacquetot de Caux and thereafter went by the name Vicomtesse Iphigenie Decaux.

Decaux died in Paris.

External links 
 painting sold at Christie's in 1999 for $79,316
 Still-life with fruit by Iphigenie Milet-Moreau on artnet
 Iphigenie Decaux on artnet
 Biography on Jerome Fine Arts

1778 births
1862 deaths
Artists from Toulon
19th-century French painters
Flower artists
French women painters
French vicomtesses
19th-century French women artists